Pond life   refers to the life forms found within ponds

It may also refer to:

 Pond Life (Doctor Who), a 2012 series of five mini-episodes of Doctor Who
 Pond Life (play), a 1992 play by Richard Cameron
 Pond Life (film), a 2018 adaptation of Cameron's play
 Pond Life (TV series), a 1996–2000 British animated series